Róbert Mike (born 8 May 1984) is a Hungarian sprint canoeist who competed in two-man and four-man events, mostly with Henrik Vasbányai. Between 2013 and 2015 they won one gold and three silver medals at the world championships. They placed fourth at the 2016 Olympics.

References

External links

 
 
 
 

Hungarian male canoeists
Living people
1984 births
ICF Canoe Sprint World Championships medalists in Canadian
Canoeists at the 2016 Summer Olympics
Olympic canoeists of Hungary
Sportspeople from Timișoara
Canoeists at the 2015 European Games
European Games competitors for Hungary
21st-century Hungarian people